German submarine U-97 was a Type VIIC U-boat built for Nazi Germany's Kriegsmarine for service during the Second World War. She carried out thirteen patrols during her career, sinking sixteen ships and damaging a seventeenth. She was a member of two wolfpacks.

U-97 was sunk on 16 June 1943 while operating in the Mediterranean Sea, west of Haifa. She was depth charged by an Australian aircraft.

Construction and deployment
U-97 was laid down at the Friedrich Krupp Germaniawerft in Kiel as yard number 602. She was launched on 15 August 1940 and commissioned on 28 September under the command of Kapitänleutnant Udo Heilmann.

Serving with the 7th U-boat Flotilla, U-97 completed training in late 1940 and early 1941 before commencing operations.

Design
German Type VIIC submarines were preceded by the shorter Type VIIB submarines. U-97 had a displacement of  when at the surface and  while submerged. She had two shafts and two  propellers.

U-97 was fitted with five  torpedo tubes (four fitted at the bow and one at the stern), fourteen torpedoes, one  SK C/35 naval gun, 220 rounds, and a  C/30 anti-aircraft gun. The boat had a complement of between forty-four and sixty.

Service history

First patrol
The boat's first patrol began with her departure from Kiel on 17 February 1941. Her route took her across the North Sea and through the gap between Iceland and the Faroe Islands.

The   had ordered the crew of British Gunner to abandon their vessel even though the master had said the ship could be towed to safety.

The U-boat then damaged G.C. Brøvig. The Norwegian tanker was a victim of U-97s third attack on Convoy OB 289. The torpedo strike caused her to lose her bow, but the bulkhead held and the engines remained usable. With assistance from HMS Petunia, she arrived at Stornoway (in the Outer Hebrides), on 27 February. She was subsequently repaired and returned to service.

The patrol was somewhat marred when a crew-member was lost overboard on 3 March. The submarine docked at Lorient in occupied France on 7 March.

Second patrol
U-97 sank three more ships between Cape Farewell (Greenland) and southern Ireland in March and April 1941. They were: Chama and Hørda (on 23 and 24 March respectively) and Conus on 4 April. There were no survivors from Hørda or Conus.

Third and fourth patrols
The boat sank , an Elders & Fyffes banana boat that had been requisitioned as an Ocean Boarding Vessel and Sangro, west southwest of Cape Clear (southern Ireland) on 6 May 1941. On 8 May she struck again, sinking Ramillies southeast of Cape Farewell.

Sortie number four was relatively uneventful, starting from St. Nazaire on 2 July 1941 and terminating in the same port on 8 August.

Fifth patrol
Departing St. Nazaire on 20 September 1941, U-97 went south, slipped past the heavily guarded British base at Gibraltar and into the Mediterranean. The merchant ship had been part of the fourth convoy of Operation Cultivate, the relief of Tobruk. She also sank Samos on the same day.

An accident which left the IIWO (second watch officer) badly injured on 24 October forced the boat to cut her patrol short. She arrived at Salamis in Greece on the 27th.

Sixth and seventh patrols
Human frailties also came to the fore during the boat's sixth patrol when, having crossed the Aegean Sea towards Turkey, she was obliged by a sick crew-member, on 7 January 1942, to return to Salamis on the ninth.

The submarine's seventh patrol started and finished in Salamis.

Eighth and ninth patrols
Having moved to La Spezia in northwest Italy in February, U-97 was attacked by a Sunderland flying boat of No. 230 Squadron RAF off the North African coast. The aircraft dropped five bombs on the boat, but caused no damage.

Patrol number nine continued the shuttle-sequence between Salamis and La Spezia.

Tenth patrol
The armed trawler HMS Burra reacted with three depth charges, but was unsuccessful.

11th and 12th patrols
These patrols began in Salamis and La Spezia; the latter finished in Pola (now Pula) in Croatia in May 1943.

13th patrol and loss
U-97s final patrol started with her departure from Pola on 5 June 1943. She was also successful against Athelmonarch northwest of Jaffa on the 15th.

The U-boat was sunk by a Lockheed Hudson of 459 Squadron, Royal Australian Air Force on 16 June 1943 west of Haifa. Twenty-seven men died, there were twenty-one survivors.

Wolfpacks
U-97 took part in two wolfpacks, namely.
 West (8 – 27 May 1941)
 Goeben (20 – 29 September 1941)

Summary of raiding history

References

Notes

Citations

Bibliography

External links

 "Found near Netanya, a huge British tanker, sunk by Hitler's submarine" http://kanal24.az/?l=en&m=xeber&id=71274

1940 ships
German Type VIIC submarines
Ships built in Kiel
U-boats commissioned in 1940
U-boats sunk by Australian aircraft
U-boats sunk by depth charges
U-boats sunk in 1943
World War II shipwrecks in the Mediterranean Sea
World War II submarines of Germany
Maritime incidents in June 1943